The 2019 season was the New York Giants' 95th in the National Football League (NFL), their 10th playing their home games at MetLife Stadium in East Rutherford, New Jersey, and their second and final season under head coach Pat Shurmur, who was fired after the final game of the regular season. During the season they equaled the franchise record nine-game losing streak of the 1976 Giants, and ultimately failed to improve on their 5–11 campaign from 2018 as they finished at 4–12 in third place in the NFC East.  For the first time since 1995, none of the team's players made the Pro Bowl.

The offseason saw some major changes to the Giants roster, with star wide receiver Odell Beckham Jr. and veteran linebacker Olivier Vernon being traded to the Cleveland Browns, and Pro Bowl safety Landon Collins being lost to the Washington Redskins during free agency. Wide receiver Golden Tate was the biggest name signing, arriving from the Philadelphia Eagles as a free agent.

After suffering defeats in the opening two games of the regular season the Giants made a change at quarterback, with veteran Eli Manning being benched in favor of first-round draft selection Daniel Jones. With Jones injured, Manning returned in Weeks 14 and 15, getting a win in the latter game to end the streak in what proved to be the final start of his 16-year career, as he announced his retirement soon after the end of the season. Manning started his last game on December 15, 2019, a 36–20 win over the Miami Dolphins.

Season summary
During the offseason the Giants made several controversial changes to their roster, headlined by the trade of star wide receiver Odell Beckham Jr. to the Cleveland Browns. The trade also sent veteran linebacker Olivier Vernon to the Browns, with the Giants receiving safety Jabrill Peppers and guard Kevin Zeitler in return, in addition to Cleveland's first-round and third-round picks in the 2019 NFL Draft. Several other starters were lost during free agency, including Pro Bowl safety Landon Collins who ultimately signed a six-year, $84 million contract with division rivals, the Washington Redskins. This led to public backlash by fans and the media since a week prior to the Odell trade, general manager Dave Gettleman stated he was not going to trade Odell. The biggest signing of free agency was Golden Tate, who joined on a four-year, $37.5 million contract from the Detroit Lions; he would ultimately be suspended for the first four games of the regular season for violating the league's performance enhancing drugs policy.

The Beckham trade meant the Giants had two first-round picks in the 2019 draft, and they added a third during the draft in a trade with the Seattle Seahawks. With those picks, they selected Duke quarterback Daniel Jones at number 6, Clemson defensive tackle Dexter Lawrence at 17, and Georgia cornerback Deandre Baker at 30. All three made the final roster, along with five of the Giants other seven draft selections. However, the Daniel Jones pick created more controversy as fans and the media criticized Gettleman on picking Jones too high as they believed Jones would be available with the 17th overall pick or later rounds. This led to the Giants not picking fan favorite prospect Ohio State QB Dwayne Haskins, who was a lifelong Giants fan who was drafted by the Washington Redskins with the 15th overall pick.

After losing the opening two games of the regular season against the Dallas Cowboys and Buffalo Bills, head coach Pat Shurmur announced that the Giants would be making a change at quarterback, with rookie Daniel Jones replacing 16-year veteran Eli Manning as the starter for the week 3 game at Tampa Bay. Jones threw for two touchdowns and rushed for two more as he led the Giants to victory, overcoming an 18-point deficit at half time and having lost star running back Saquon Barkley to injury in the second quarter. It was the Giants first win after being 18 or more points behind at half-time since 1949, and the second largest comeback in NFL history by a rookie quarterback making their first start. After MRI scans the following day, it was announced that Barkley had suffered a high right ankle sprain that would keep him out for four to eight weeks.

The Giants moved to 2–2 for the season with victory over the Washington Redskins the following week, but then suffered back-to-back defeats against the Minnesota Vikings and New England Patriots before Barkley returned sooner than expected for the week six match-up against the Arizona Cardinals. His return did not improve the team's fortunes as they lost their next two games to reach the midpoint of the regular season at 2–6. Prior to the NFL trade deadline, on October 29 the Giants sought to improve their struggling defense by trading for Leonard Williams from the New York Jets. It was the first time in NFL history the two organizations had completed a trade.

Further injury problems affected the team with starting wide receiver Sterling Shepard suffering from ongoing concussion symptoms that could be potentially career threatening. Having suffered a concussion during the week 1 game against the Dallas Cowboys, he suffered another during the week 5 game against the Minnesota Vikings and had been out since then, being put back into concussion protocol prior to the week 9 loss to the Cowboys. He was joined on the sidelines by starting center Jon Halapio, starting right tackle Mike Remmers and starting tight end Evan Engram, who would ultimately sit out the rest of the season. Starting left tackle Nate Solder and starting cornerback Janoris Jenkins then suffered concussions during the week 10 game against the New York Jets, as the Giants suffered their sixth straight defeat and entered their bye week in third place in the NFC East at 2–8.

The Giants losing streak continued after their bye with defeats against two NFC North opponents, the Chicago Bears in week 12 and Green Bay Packers in week 13, that firstly confirmed a third straight losing season and then put them out of contention for the playoffs. During the Packers game Jones suffered a high ankle sprain and, although he was able to finish the game, he would be ruled out of the following week's divisional match-up against the Eagles paving the way for Eli Manning to return as the starting quarterback. On his return Manning led the Giants to a healthy 17–3 halftime lead, linking up with rookie wide receiver Darius Slayton for two touchdowns, but he was unable to get the offense moving at all in the second half as the Eagles scored 14 unanswered points before snatching victory in overtime. With the loss the Giants tied the franchise record of nine consecutive defeats set in 1976. After calling a fan a "retard" on Twitter on the Wednesday following the game, and later failing to satisfactorily apologize, Jenkins was waived with an injury designation on December 13, 2019; he was claimed off waivers by the New Orleans Saints.

With Jones remaining on the sidelines in week 15, Manning continued as the starter as the Giants finally snapped their nine game losing streak by defeating the Miami Dolphins 36–20. It was seen by many as a fitting farewell for Manning in what was his final start at Metlife Stadium. Jones returned to the starting lineup in Week 16 against the Redskins in a match up between rookie QBs in Dwayne Haskins and Daniel Jones. Jones threw for a career high 352 yards and five touchdowns while Saquon Barkley rushed for a career high 189 yards and caught 4 passes with 90 receiving yards and two touchdowns as the Giants won 41–35 in overtime, sweeping the Redskins for the first time since 2014. On December 30, 2019, the day after a 34–17 loss to the Philadelphia Eagles in Week 17 left the team with a losing 4–12 record for the season, head coach Pat Shurmur was fired.

Following the end of the season, Eli Manning announced his retirement.

Player movements

Free agency

Players with the Giants in the 2018 season

Players signed by the Giants from other teams

NFL Draft

Notes
The Giants forfeited their third-round selection after selecting cornerback Sam Beal in the 2018 supplemental draft.
The Giants were awarded a fifth-round compensatory pick (171st overall) due to losing Justin Pugh to the Arizona Cardinals during the 2018 Offseason.

Pre-draft trades

The Giants traded 2018 fourth-round (John Franklin-Myers) and sixth-round (John Kelly) picks to the Los Angeles Rams for linebacker Alec Ogletree and a 2019 seventh-round pick (245th).
The Giants traded center Brett Jones to the Minnesota Vikings in exchange for their seventh-round selection (232rd).
The Giants traded Eli Apple to New Orleans for their 2019 fourth-round pick (132nd) and their 2020 seventh-round pick. The 2019 pick was traded to Seattle during the draft.
The Giants traded Damon Harrison to Detroit for a conditional 2019 fifth-round pick. The condition was that the Lions would give the higher of their own 2019 fifth-round pick or the fifth-round pick that was previously acquired from the San Francisco 49ers in a trade for Laken Tomlinson. Ultimately the Giants received the pick originally held by San Francisco (142nd). This pick was traded to Seattle during the draft.
The Giants traded wide receiver Odell Beckham Jr. and defensive end Olivier Vernon to the Cleveland Browns in exchange for a first-round selection (17th), a third-round selection previously acquired from New England (95th), guard Kevin Zeitler, and safety Jabrill Peppers.

Draft trades
The Giants traded their second-, fourth- and fifth-round selections (37th, 132nd and 142nd) for Seattle's first-round selection (30th) to select Deandre Baker.

Undrafted free agents
The Giants signed a number of undrafted free agents. Unless stated otherwise, they were signed on May 2, 2019.

Other signings

Practice squad
Having been cut as the roster was trimmed to the 53-man limit on August 31, Reggie White, Jr., Jon Hilliman, C. J. Conrad, Josiah Tauaefa, Jake Carlock, Evan Brown, Freedom Akinmoladun and Chris Slayton were resigned to the practice squad alongside new signings Corn Elder and David Sills V. On September 18, 2019, Conrad was released and running back Austin Walter was signed to replace him. Following an injury to starting running back Saquon Barkley in week 3, Hilliman was signed to the active roster on September 26. On October 1, Tauaefa was signed to the active roster and the Giants filled out their practice squad by signing wide receiver Da'Mari Scott, who had been with the team during the offseason, and linebacker Devante Downs.

With backup running back Wayne Gallman joining Barkley on the sidelines, Walter was signed to the active roster on October 10, prior to the week 6 matchup against New England. Hilliman was resigned to the practice squad on October 15, 2019 having been waived following the New England game. On October 22, 2019 Downs was signed to the active roster; the place was filled by Tuzar Skipper, who had been waived on the same day. On October 30, 2019 Carlock was released, with punter Sean Smith being signed to replace him the following day. Smith was released on November 5, Safety Sean Chandler was signed to the practice squad on November 6, the day after he was waived from the active roster.

On November 9, with the Giants struggling with injuries to several members of the offensive line, Brown was signed to the active roster. On November 12, Elder was signed by the Carolina Panthers. Later that day, White and Akinmoladun were released and the open spots on the practice squad were filled by tight end Garrett Dickerson, wide receiver Alex Bachman and long-snapper Colin Holba. On November 13, Brown was re-signed. On November 20, Skipper was signed by the Pittsburgh Steelers, with cornerback Derrick Baity filling the vacancy on the practice squad. On November 27, Scott was promoted to the active roster, and White was re-signed. On November 30, Holba was promoted to the active roster.

On December 4, Brown was signed by the Miami Dolphins. On December 5, the Giants signed rookie center Tanner Volson, and ex-Panthers safety Rashaan Gaulden to the fill the vacant spots on the practice squad. On December 7, Chandler was re-signed to the active roster, replacing Jabrill Peppers, who was placed on injured reserve. On December 11, Sean Smith was re-signed to fill the vacancy. On December 17, Sills was signed the active roster, and tackle Nate Wozniak was signed to the practice squad. The following day, Gaulden was promoted and defensive end Kevin Wilkins was added to the practice squad. On December 24, Smith was released and full back George Aston signed to replace him on the roster. Slayton and Dickerson were promoted to the active roster on December 27 and 28 respectively.

Reserve/Futures
Following the end of the season all eight remaining practice squad members (Aston, Bachman, Baity, Hilliman, Volson, White, Jr., Wilkins and Wozniak) were signed to reserve/futures contracts along with Conrad and Smith, who had both been with the Giants earlier in the season, and long snapper Drew Scott.

Other departures

To trim the roster down to the 53-man NFL limit prior to the league's August 31 deadline, many players were cut (waived) on this date.

Trade details
 On March 14, the Giants traded wide receiver Odell Beckham Jr. and linebacker Olivier Vernon to Cleveland for safety Jabrill Peppers, guard Kevin Zeitler, a first-round pick (#17), and a third-round pick (#95) in the 2019 NFL Draft.
 On September 2, the Giants traded B. J. Goodson to the Green Bay Packers in exchange for the right to swap seventh-round picks in the 2020 NFL Draft.
 On October 29, the Giants traded for defensive end Leonard Williams from the New York Jets in exchange for a third-round pick in the 2020 NFL Draft and a fifth-round pick in the 2021 NFL Draft, which could become a fourth-round pick should Williams sign a contract extension before the start of the 2020 season.

Staff

Final roster

Preseason

Regular season

Schedule

Note: Intra-division opponents are in bold text.

Game summaries

Week 1: at Dallas Cowboys

For the third consecutive season, the Giants began at 0–1. This was their fifth consecutive loss to the Cowboys. Eli Manning set a franchise record being the first Giant to play 16 seasons, and first round pick Daniel Jones made his NFL debut in the late stages of a blowout loss.

Week 2: vs. Buffalo Bills

The Giants scored a touchdown on their opening drive and struggled to move the ball afterwards. With the loss, the Giants fell to 0–2. This game is notable for being Eli Manning's final start before being benched in favor of rookie Daniel Jones.

Week 3: at Tampa Bay Buccaneers

Rookie quarterback Daniel Jones made his first career start ahead of 16-year veteran Eli Manning. The Giants emerged victorious after erasing an 18-point deficit thanks to 336 passing yards and four total touchdowns from Jones, including the game-winning rushing touchdown on 4th and 5 with 1:16 to play. Tampa Bay still had a chance to win, but Matt Gay missed the game-winning field goal as time expired. With their first win of the 2019 season, the Giants improved to 1–2, though star running back Saquon Barkley left the game after spraining his ankle.

Daniel Jones became the first Giants QB since Charlie Conerly in 1948 to have two passing and two rushing touchdowns in the same game. He was named the NFC Offensive Player of the Week for his performance.

Week 4: vs. Washington Redskins

Backup RB Wayne Gallman had 2 total touchdowns with Saquon Barkley out. Daniel Jones threw one touchdown pass – to Gallman – in his second career win and the Giants improved to 2–2. Safety Jabrill Peppers also picked off Redskins rookie quarterback Dwayne Haskins and scored a touchdown to seal the victory.

Week 5: vs. Minnesota Vikings

Daniel Jones was outmatched by the Vikings defense and the Giants fell to 2–3, their first of a franchise record 9 losses in a row.

Week 6: at New England Patriots

Daniel Jones connected with wide receiver Golden Tate on a 64-yard strike, which was the first passing touchdown the Patriots allowed in 2019. Second year linebacker Lorenzo Carter (American Football) stripped Tom Brady which the Giants scored on the ensuing fumble tying the game 14–14. Both teams showed off stout defensive play as both offenses struggled to gain any traction moving the ball through the first 3 quarters until the Patriots broke through in the 4th and iced the game 35–14.

Week 7: vs. Arizona Cardinals

Despite Saquon Barkley returning from injury, the Giants quickly fell in a 17–0 deficit which proved to be too much to overcome despite clawing back in the game. Backup running back Chase Edmonds scored 3 touchdowns for the Cardinals in the loss and the Giants fell to 2–5.

Week 8: at Detroit Lions

Daniel Jones threw 4 touchdown passes for the first time in his career, but had a key fumble in the 2nd quarter which former Giant Devon Kennard scored on. The defense also had few answers for Matthew Stafford, and the Giants fell to 2–6.

Week 9: vs. Dallas Cowboys

The Giants fell to 2–7 and lost their 6th consecutive game to the Cowboys. This game is famous for being interrupted by a stray black cat in the 2nd quarter, which the media pointed out put a hex on both the Giants and the Cowboys. The Giants blew a 12–3 lead and would go 2–6 in their second half of the season, while the Cowboys squandered their 5–3 record after this game, going 3–5 the rest of the season to finish 8–8 and miss the playoffs. Cowboys head coach Jason Garrett was not retained by the Cowboys for the 2020 season and was subsequently hired as the Giants offensive coordinator.

Week 10: at New York Jets

Like with Detroit, Daniel Jones threw for 4 touchdown passes but was stripped on a key play where Jamal Adams scored for the Jets. The Giants defense blew a 4th quarter lead and lost their 2nd game in a row to the Jets.

Week 12: at Chicago Bears

Both offenses were anemic, and the Giants dropped to 2–9 and suffered their third straight losing season. Kicker Aldrick Rosas missed 2 field goals in the 5-point loss.

Week 13: vs. Green Bay Packers
 The loss would eliminate the Giants from playoff contention for the third straight season. Daniel Jones threw 3 interceptions and suffered an ankle injury. The 8th straight loss was their longest since 2004.

Week 14: at Philadelphia Eagles

Week 14 featured Eli Manning taking over for an injured Daniel Jones against the injury-ravaged Philadelphia Eagles. Following a scoreless first quarter, Manning delivered a 35-yard touchdown pass to Darius Slayton on the first play of the second to put New York up 7–0. After the teams traded field goals, Manning would throw another touchdown pass to Slayton, this time from 55 yards, to build the Giants' lead to 17–3 before halftime. However, the offense would fall silent in the second half, going three-and-out on four of six possessions and putting up just 30 yards of total offense. The Eagles would take advantage and score 14 unanswered points over the final two-quarters to force overtime. After the Eagles won the overtime coin toss, the Giants defense failed to slow Philadelphia down, and the Eagles prevailed on Carson Wentz's second touchdown pass of the night to Zach Ertz. With this loss, the Giants dropped to 2–11 on the year, and matched a franchise-worst nine-game losing streak set in 1976. Furthermore, the loss marked the first time that the Giants trailed the Eagles in their all-time series. It also marked the first time since 2006 a Eagles-Giants game went to overtime.

Week 15: vs. Miami Dolphins

With the win, the Giants snapped their nine-game losing streak and improved to 3–11 in Eli Manning's final NFL game. He threw his final touchdown to rookie Darius Slayton and his final pass, a completion to Sterling Shepard. He was removed from the game by backup Alex Tanney to a standing ovation from the fans and family in attendance. Manning would later announce his retirement on January 22, 2020 and had his number retired by the Giants in 2021.

Manning finished his professional football career, all 16 years with the Giants, with a 117–117 record as a starter and 8–4 in playoff games. His 4,895/8,119 with 57,023 passing yards, 366 touchdowns and 244 interceptions are all franchise records. He also retired 7th in NFL history in passing yards and touchdown passes.

Week 16: at Washington Redskins

Because Joe Burrow was a shoe-in to be drafted 1st overall to the Cincinnati Bengals, this was informally known as the Chase Young Bowl as both the Giants and Redskins were still in the running to pick 2nd. With Daniel Jones back in the lineup for New York, the Giants withstood a late rally by the rival Redskins and improved to 4–11 with the overtime victory. Daniel Jones became the first rookie quarterback in NFL history to throw for 300 yards, 5 touchdowns, and no turnovers in a single game. The win also made the Giants finish in third place in the NFC East, marking the first time since 2016 in which the Giants did not finish last in the division. This was the last time Washington played against the Giants as the Redskins, as they would change their name before the 2020 season. Washington ended up selecting DE Chase Young with the 2nd overall pick in the 2020 NFL Draft, and the Giants selected OT Andrew Thomas with the 4th overall pick.

Week 17: vs. Philadelphia Eagles

The Giants finished 4–12 with the loss, their seventh straight against the Eagles dating back to the 2016 season. Head coach Pat Shurmur was dismissed the following day along with most of his staff. Shurmur finished with a 9–23 record in his two seasons coaching the team. His .281 winning percentage is second worst in Giants franchise history.

Standings

Division

Conference

References

New York Giants
New York Giants seasons
New York Giants season
21st century in East Rutherford, New Jersey
Meadowlands Sports Complex